Coleophora isodonta is a moth of the family Coleophoridae. It is found in Mongolia.

References

isodonta
Moths described in 1977
Moths of Asia